Corantos were early informational broadsheets, precursors to newspapers. Beginning around the 14th century, a system developed where letters of news and philosophical discussion would be sent to a central collecting point to be bundled and sent around to the various correspondents. The banking house of Fugger had an organized system of collecting and routing these letters, which often could be seen by outsiders. This system would not die until the 18th century. The term "newspaper" was not coined till 1670. Prior to this, a welter of terms were used to describe this genre, including "paper", "newsbook", "pamphlet", "broadsheet", and "coranto".

External links 
 Coranto at Encyclopædia Britannica

Newspaper terminology